Tola may refer to:

Places 
 Bella Tola, a mountain in the Pennine Alps in the Swiss canton of Valais
 La Tola, a town and municipality in the Nariño Department, Colombia
Tola (Shakargarh), a village in Pakistan
 Tola, Rivas, a municipality in Nicaragua
 Tuul River, also Tola River, in Mongolia

Other uses 
Tola (name)
 Tola (unit), Indian unit of mass
 Tola or Tula, variant transcriptions of Tuul, a river in Mongolia
 Tola (Parastrephia lepidophylla), a bush, typical of South American Puna grassland
 St Tola, a brand of goat cheese
 Tola, a chocolate by Nestle

See also

Amharic-language names